Porvenir Norte Airport is an airport serving the village of Porvenir in the Santa Cruz Department of Bolivia.

See also

Transport in Bolivia
List of airports in Bolivia

References

External links 
OpenStreetMap - Porvenir Norte
OurAirports - Porvenir Norte
Porvenir Norte

Airports in Santa Cruz Department (Bolivia)